Savva is a name of Greek origin derived from Aramaic סָבָא sāḇā meaning 'wise'. Notable people with the name include:

Given name
Savva Chevakinsky (1709 – after 1774), Russian architect
Savva Georgiou (1933–1992), Cypriot football striker
Savva Kulish (1936–2001), Soviet film director and screenwriter
Savva Lika (born 1970), Greek javelin thrower
Savva Mamontov (1841–1918), Russian industrialist, merchant, entrepreneur, and patron of the arts
Savva Morozov (1862–1905), Russian businessman and philanthropist
Savva Yamshchikov (1938–2009), a leading expert on Russian provincial art

Surname
Amber Savva (born 1993), British actress
Anna Savva, British actress
Nick Savva (born 1934), British greyhound trainer
Niki Savva, Cypriot-born Australian journalist, author
Savvas Savva (born 1958), Cypriot composer, musicologist and pianist

See also
 village in Mordovia, Russia
Sabbas
Sava (name)
Savvas (disambiguation)